Uckerfelde is a municipality in the Uckermark district of Brandenburg, Germany.

Demography

References

Localities in Uckermark (district)